The New Taipei City Main Public Library is the central library of New Taipei City, Taiwan. It is the main library of the New Taipei City Public Library System and opened in May 2015. The building is located in Guixing Rd, Banqiao District, near the Taipei Metro Far Eastern Hospital Station. It is the first library in Taiwan to offer 24-hour service.

Architecture
New Taipei City Main Public Library comprises 10 above-ground floors and three below.

Floor Plan

References

External links

New Taipei City Main Public Library Official Website (English version)

2015 establishments in Taiwan
Buildings and structures in New Taipei
Education in New Taipei
Public libraries in Taiwan
Banqiao District